Qarneh-ye Sofla (also Romanized as Qarneh-ye Soflá; also known as Qarneh, Garīz Ney, Ghirni, Qara Nāy, Qara Neh, and Qarneh-ye Pā’īn) is a village in Pain Velayat Rural District, Razaviyeh District, Mashhad County, Razavi Khorasan Province, Iran. At the 2006 census, its population was 341, in 78 families.

References 

Populated places in Mashhad County